The Nor-Bath Trail is a  multi-use rail-trail that runs between the boroughs of Northampton and Bath in Northampton County, Pennsylvania.

The trail follows the route of the former Northampton and Bath Railroad, a shortline railroad connecting the Atlas Portland Cement Company to other railroads. The rail fell into disuse in 1979 as the local cement industry began to decline. In 2017, a  asphalt extension was added to the trail in order to link it to the D&L Trail

The trail begins in Northampton, sharing the same trailhead as the D&L Trail, and continues past the Atlas Cement Company Memorial Museum, the Northampton Recreation Center, and Atlas Sports Complex. The trail then enters a wooded portion before running through a residential area. The trail continues and crosses Airport Road (Pennsylvania Route 987), and ends near Jacksonville Park in Bath.

References

External links 
Northampton County Website

Rail trails in Pennsylvania
Protected areas of Northampton County, Pennsylvania